Kidryachevo (Qıźras) is a rural locality (a selo) and the administrative centre of Kidryachevsky Selsoviet, Davlekanovsky District, Bashkortostan, Russia. The population was 487 as of 2010. There are 5 streets.

Geography 
Kidryachevo is located 47 km west of Davlekanovo (the district's administrative centre) by road. Chapayevo is the nearest rural locality.

References 

Rural localities in Davlekanovsky District